Lahser High School was a high school in Bloomfield Township, Oakland County, Michigan, near Bloomfield Hills and in Greater Detroit. It was a part of Bloomfield Hills Schools. The school was opened in 1967. At the time it had 200 students, and enrollment later reached almost 900 students. In 2010, the decision was made to merge the school with sister school Andover High School, on Andover's grounds. In 2020, it was decided that the Lahser campus would become the site of Bloomfield Hills Middle School North following a successful bond proposal. The football program had five consecutive playoff-eligible seasons, 2002–2006, in both class 3 and class 2 MHSAA competition.

Lahser won several MHSAA state championships including: men's soccer (1999), men's/women's tennis (men's, 2002), women's lacrosse, and women's golf.

Lahser competed within the Oakland Activities Association Blue Division for football.  Most of Lahser's students came from Bloomfield Hills and Bloomfield Township. Lahser's crosstown rival was Andover High School, which is the current site of the merged Bloomfield Hills High School

Academic departments
Lahser offered several AP courses and introduced IB courses starting 2013. There were a variety of courses available to take, and departments include:

 Business
 Communication & Dramatic Arts
 Deaf/Hard of Hearing
 Engineering
 English
 Family & Consumer Science
 Health & Physical Education
 IB DP (International Baccalaureate Diploma Programme)
 Man in Nature (MIN)
 Math
 Model United Nations (MUN)
 Music & Theater Departments
 Science
 Social Studies
 Support Services or Directed Studies
 Visual Arts
 World Languages

Athletic departments
Fall sports:

 Cheerleading
 Color Guard/Winter Guard
 Marching Band
 Cross Country
 Dames (Girls Dance Team)
 Football
 Girls Golf
 Boys Soccer
 Girls Swimming & Diving
 Boys Tennis
 Girls Volleyball

Winter Sports:

 Girls Basketball
 Boys Basketball
 Cheerleading
 Color Guard/Winter Guard
 Boys Bloomfield Ice Hockey
 Girls Bloomfield Ice Hockey
 Skiing
 Boys Swimming
 Wrestling

Spring sports:

 Boys Baseball
 Boys Golf
 Boys Lacrosse
 Girls Lacrosse
 Girls Soccer
 Girls Softball
 Girls Tennis
 Track & Field

Notable alumni

Tanith Belbin, 2006 Olympic Ice Dancing Silver Medalist (attended 1999–2000)
Sean Forbes, Deaf American hip-hop artist (class of 2000)
Armen Keteyian, investigative reporter (class of 1971)
 Yante Maten, basketball player at the University of Georgia and 2018 co-Player of the Year in the Southeastern Conference (class of 2014; graduated from Bloomfield Hills High)
Ronna Romney McDaniel, chair of the Republican National Committee
Chad Smith, drummer for the band Red Hot Chili Peppers (1980)
Joe Hawley, singer and guitarist for the band Tally Hall (class of 2001) 
Ross Federman, singer and drummer for the band Tally Hall
Pierce Codina, drummer for the band Divino Niño 
Neil Mandt, 5-Time Emmy Winning TV and movie producer (attended 1985–1987)
Milt Carthens, professional football player

References

External links
 Lahser High School
 Bloomfield Hills Public Schools

Bloomfield Hills, Michigan
Public high schools in Michigan
Educational institutions established in 1967
High schools in Oakland County, Michigan
Schools in Bloomfield Township, Oakland County, Michigan
Educational institutions disestablished in 2013
2013 disestablishments in Michigan
1967 establishments in Michigan